The Australian magpie (Gymnorhina tibicen) is a medium-sized black and white passerine bird native to Australia and southern New Guinea. Members of two subspecies groups, black-backed and white-backed magpies, were introduced into New Zealand to control pests in pastures.

The birds can be agonistic and during the breeding season  whilst nestlings are defenceless for the first 2-3 weeks the males will be very protective and swoop anything they perceive as a threat to their young. This can often be avoided by acknowledging their presence or if possible befriending them with regular reassuring interaction to let them know you are not a threat. These birds are very intelligent, have contributed to tremendous advances in medicine and engineering, and have facial recognition as well as the ability to communicate to each other both spatially and inter-generationally. So if they recognise someone because of a previous negative interaction they will also perceive them as a threat to their defenceless offspring and to the continuation of the species.

Introduction into New Zealand
Birds taken mainly from Tasmania and Victoria in Australia were introduced into New Zealand by local Acclimatisation Societies of Otago and Canterbury in the 1860s, with the Wellington Acclimatisation Society releasing 260 birds in 1874. White-backed forms are spread on both the North and eastern South Island, while black-backed forms are found in the Hawke's Bay region. Magpies were introduced into New Zealand to control agricultural pests, and were therefore a protected species until 1951. It is currently illegal to breed, sell, or distribute the birds within New Zealand.

Evidence of pest status
Documented academic studies have provided little if any evidence that the Australian magpie is a predator of native species in New Zealand. Anecdotal evidence is flawed, being highly subjective, frequently uninformed and therefore largely erroneous. Many interactions between this species and others can be explained by the viewer's misinterpretation of avian behaviours, incorrect readings of predetermining, contributing factors or even just a general lack of knowledge on basic avian biology. Scientific peer reviewed academic research carried out over decades seldom if at all justifies the Australian magpie's status as a pest species in New Zealand, let alone a predator. They have been accused of affecting bird populations such as the tui and kererū, or sometimes raiding nests for eggs and nestlings. However studies by Waikato University have cast doubt on these common yet unsubstantiated beliefs. The same authors suggest that birds avoid areas close to magpies as they are sometimes attacked by breeding adults, but actual attacks are infrequent. These same studies suggest that in fact the presence of magpies has a positive effect on indigenous bird populations as they successfully chase off proven predators such as swamp harriers.

Regional controls
Pest Australian magpies are not classified as a pest organism at a national level. (NZ Biosecurity- direct communication via email). Any pest classification and subsequent management is done at a regional level in New Zealand and specific Regional Pest Management Strategies (RPMS) are developed. The Biosecurity Act 1993 grants powers to territorial authorities to carry out pest control.

Nine regional councils funded a study by Landcare Research and Waikato University, which concluded magpies had minimal or no effect on indigenous or other bird life and found no evidence that they are serious pests – therefore any control measures would be for other reasons (e.g. conflict with humans).

Nelson
The Nelson City Council classes the magpie (both black-backed and white-backed forms) as a Containment Pest under the Nelson Tasman Regional Pest Management Strategy. This means that the Council will encourage the control of the magpies, including the supply of traps. Under the Biosecurity Act magpies cannot be knowingly sold, propagated, bred, released, or commercially displayed.

Wellington
In the Wellington Region magpies are classed as a Site-led pest animal. Under the RPMS for the region magpies are controlled for human health and environmental reasons using a variety of methods.

Southland
The Southland Regional Council also includes magpies in their RPMS.

Cultural references
The comic Footrot Flats features a magpie character by the name of Pew. It is portrayed as dysfunctional after being hand reared and often seeking revenge after the tree in which it had nested was cut down.

The Magpies was a popular poem written in 1964 by poet Denis Glover. In the poem each verse except for the last one ended with the couplet:

And Quardle oodle ardle wardle doodle/The magpies said,

This imitation of the distinctive call of the magpie is one of the most recognised lines in New Zealand poetry.

See also
Invasive species in New Zealand

References

Further reading

External links
Australian magpie at Te Ara: The Encyclopedia of New Zealand
Gymnorhina tibicen at the Invasive Species Specialist Group

Invasive animal species in New Zealand
Introduced birds
Artamidae